Milica Bodrožić is a Serbian writer and academic specialized on the political history of Yugoslavia. She was a member of the Museum of the Yugoslav People's Revolution in Belgrade.

Work

References

Yugoslav writers
Serbian non-fiction writers
Year of birth missing
Year of death missing
20th-century Serbian women writers